Roberto Ribaud (born 30 June 1961) is a former Italian sprinter who specialized in the 400 meter dash.

Biography
Roberto Ribaud won three medals, at senior level, at the International athletics competitions, and won four edition of the individual national championship. He participated at one editions of the Summer Olympics (1984), he has 43 caps in national team from 1982 to 1990.

He holds the top three Italian best performance of all-time in the 4×400 metres relay, established between 1981 and 1986. His personal best time is 45.69 seconds, achieved in the heats of the 1986 European Championships in Stuttgart, is today the 11th best Italian performance of all-time.

National records
 4x400 metres relay: 3:01.42 ( Zagreb, 16 August 1981) - with Stefano Malinverni, Alfonso Di Guida, Mauro Zuliani - current holder

Achievements

National titles
He has won 4 times the individual national championship.
1 win in the 400 metres (1983)
3 wins in the 400 metres indoor (1981, 1982, 1985)

See also
 Italian all-time lists - 400 metres
 Italian all-time lists - 4×400 metres relay
 Italy national relay team

References

External links
 

1961 births
Living people
Sportspeople from Taranto
Italian male sprinters
Athletes (track and field) at the 1984 Summer Olympics
Olympic athletes of Italy
World Athletics Championships athletes for Italy
Mediterranean Games gold medalists for Italy
Mediterranean Games silver medalists for Italy
Athletes (track and field) at the 1983 Mediterranean Games
Athletes (track and field) at the 1987 Mediterranean Games
Mediterranean Games medalists in athletics
Italian Athletics Championships winners